Repulsive guidance molecule B (RGMb), also known as DRAGON (DRG11-responsive axonal guidance and outgrowth of neurite), is a bone morphogenetic protein (BMP) co-receptor of the repulsive guidance molecule family. In humans this protein is encoded by the RGMB gene.

Function 

RGMB is a glycosylphosphatidylinositol (GPI)-anchored member of the repulsive guidance molecule family (see also RGMA and RGMC) and contributes to the patterning of the developing nervous system.

There is a potential association between RGMs and cancer bone metastasis, as RGMs coordinate bone morphogenetic protein (BMP) signaling. RGMB may act as a negative regulator in vitro in breast cancer and prostate cancer through BMP signalling. Furthermore, aberrant expression of RGMs was indicated in breast cancer. The perturbed expression was associated with disease progression and poor prognosis.

References

Further reading

Genes on human chromosome 5
Receptors